Ring Warriors was an American professional wrestling promotion based in Las Vegas, Nevada. Ring Warriors was a member promotion of the National Wrestling Alliance from September 2011 to 2012. They returned with a television series, which premiered on WGN America on September 15, 2018. Their latest heavyweight champion was Killer Kross.

History
In the early 1990s, Florida-based promoter Howard Brody partnered with Hiro Matsuda for World Superstars of Wrestling, Inc. and together they created an Americanized version of New Japan Pro-Wrestling's World Pro Wrestling Japanese TV show for international TV called Ring Warriors. The show appeared on Eurosport, ESPN Asia, South African Broadcasting Corporation and various other networks around the world. Initially the show was hosted by Craig DeGeorge and Sir Oliver Humperdink and after the first 26 episodes, DeGeorge was replaced by Gordon Solie, who was retiring from WCW. While the goal of Ring Warriors was to eventually create a U.S.-based promotion with the same philosophy and style as what was presented on TV, Matsuda died before that goal was realized.

In an attempt to get into the U.S. market, in 1997 World Superstars of Wrestling, Inc. partnered with the now defunct VDO and Webstar (ISP), Scott Crompton and George Zhen, broadcasting one of the first video based websites. Shot on location in Tampa Bay, Florida, Matsuda and Brody produced six one hour episodes with hosts Gordon Solie and Bruno Sammartino. Sir Oliver Humperdink did an interview segment with various wrestling personalities such as Dan "The Beast" Severn, Danny Spivey and others. With the Internet in such an infancy, technology and bandwidth could not support the endeavor so the broadcast only lasted the six episodes. Unofficially, Ring Warriors was the first television show to be broadcast on the Internet.

Brody, along with partners Larry Brannon (a.k.a. Vito DeNucci) and Paul Jones (not the wrestling manager), revived the "Ring Warriors" name for a new promotion in 2011. This incarnation was founded as a member of the National Wrestling Alliance.

In May 2013, Ring Warriors announced a restructuring of its organization. Paul Jones, who had been chief executive officer of Ring Warriors, LLC since it was first established in September 2011, was moved to business development adviser for the company and consultant on the Ring Warriors executive board. In addition to his new duties at Ring Warriors, Jones was the Battling Bombshells CEO and President. Also, the managing partners Larry Brannon and Howard T. Brody assumed the roles of COO and CEO respectively and the company also announced it has secured Angel Financing from a private funding group that has offices in South Florida and Las Vegas. The private funding enabled Ring Warriors to begin its long-awaited foray into television production and the company planned its first set of tapings in South Florida in July 2013. On March 20, 2014, Ring Warriors announced an international TV distribution deal with Fighting Spirit. In April 2015, Ring Warriors held a 6-hour TV taping at the WPBT studios. The company planned to broadcast the show in India, Singapore and Thailand. On August 15, 2015, Ring Warriors announced a TV Taping deal at Tampa Letter Carriers Hall in Tampa, Florida. However, the promotion closed in 2016.

On June 9, 2018, Ring Warriors announced they would return in August. On July 23, 2018, Ring Warriors announced on Facebook a national television partnership with WGN America. Ring Warriors would debut on the network starting September 15, 2018. In December 2018, it was announced that episodes of Ring Warriors would begin streaming on Amazon Prime Video, starting with the show's "Winter Finale" on December 22, 2018.

Ring Warriors ceased operations after the season finale on December 22, 2018.

Champions

Grand Championship

Global Tag Team Championship

Bahamian Championship

Battling Bombshells Championship

See also
List of National Wrestling Alliance territories
List of independent wrestling promotions in the United States

References
General

Specific

External links
Ring Warriors on Cagematch.net

American professional wrestling television series
Independent professional wrestling promotions based in Florida
Entertainment companies established in 2011
National Wrestling Alliance members